Korp! Leola (Leola Corporation) is an Estonian student fraternity, established on 16 October 1920 as the first student fraternity in Tallinn and also the first one established in the newly independent Estonia.

After being declared forbidden under the Soviet occupations in 1940, Korp! Leola was re-established in Estonia in 1988. The group is among several student corporations affiliated with Tallinn University of Technology.

Mottos: "faithfulness, goodness, honesty"; Age quod agis.

References

External links
 

Fraternities and sororities in Estonia
Student organizations established in 1920
1920 establishments in Estonia